The Eastern Ontario Junior Hockey League is a Junior ice hockey league operating in Eastern Ontario, Canada. The league is sanctioned by Hockey Eastern Ontario and Hockey Canada and acts as a second tier to the Central Canada Hockey League.  The 16 member teams of the league compete for the Barkley Cup.  Dating back to the 1960s, the league was known until 2015 as the Eastern Ontario Junior B Hockey League. The League was known from 2015 to 2020 as the Central Canada Hockey League Tier 2.

History
The EOJHL was founded in 1966 as the Rideau-St. Lawrence Junior "B" Hockey League.  Through a merger with the Upper Ottawa Valley Junior "B" Hockey League and the folding of the Lanark-Renfrew Junior "C" Hockey League, the league had grown to 22 different teams.

For the 2007-08 season, the Kemptville 73's moved from the EOJBHL to the Central Junior A Hockey League.  A season later, the EOJBHL sold their franchise rights to the then-owners of the Casselman Stars of the Eastern Ontario Junior C Hockey League and then town of Casselman, Ontario.  The new team, the Casselman Vikings, began play in the 2008-09 season.

In May 2009, the league dropped the Junior "B" designation from its name, becoming the Eastern Ontario Junior Hockey League (EOJHL).

For the 2009-10 season, the Carleton Place Kings moved from the EOJHL to the Central Canada Hockey League. The Kings were replaced the same year by the new Almonte Thunder.

In April 2014, the EOJHL Champion Casselman Vikings traveled to Port Hawkesbury, Nova Scotia to compete in the Eastern Canadian Junior B Championship.  Cassleman became the first team west of Atlantic Canada to compete in the Don Johnson Memorial Cup tournament since its inception in 1982.  Casselman went 6-0-0 and won the championship.

At the beginning of the 2015-16 season, the league changed its name to the CCHL2 and cut down to 16 teams from 22 teams which saw the removal of the Shawville Pontiacs, Akwesasne Wolves, Gananoque Islanders, Almonte Thunder, Morrisburg Lions, and Gatineau Mustangs.

The CCHL2 consists of two divisions, the Martin Division and Richardson Division.  The league offers a 52-game balanced schedule where everyone plays everyone at least once.  The two Divisional Playoff champions battle for the Barkley Cup every April.

In March 2017, the Pembroke Lumber Kings (CCHL) announced the purchase of the Prescott Flyers as their CCHL2 affiliate and relocating the team to Cobden and calling them the Whitewater Kings.  Also in March, the Carleton Place Canadians (CCHL) announced the purchase of the Clarence Beavers and relocated them to Carleton Place, naming them the Carleton Place Junior Canadians.  The Rockland Nationals of the National Capital Junior Hockey League will relocate to Clarence to fill in for the departed Beavers. The Metcalfe Jets will move to the National Capital Junior Hockey League and in return the Embrun Panthers will move up to the CCHL2.

Teams

Playoff champions
There is no National Championship for Junior B hockey in Canada, similar championships are held in Ontario (Sutherland Cup), Western Canada (Keystone Cup), Quebec (Coupe Dodge), and Atlantic Canada (Don Johnson Memorial Cup).

Up until the end of the 2015 playoffs, each team listed is a division champion, both the league champion and finalists are either "Metro/Valley" or "Rideau/St. Lawrence" Conference champions. Bolded are league champions, Italicized are finalists.

The EOJHL became the CCHL2 for the 2015-16 season reducing to just two divisions.

2022 playoffs
{{4RoundBracket-Byes
| RD1         = Wild Card Series
| RD2         = Quarter Finals
| RD3         = Semi Finals
| RD4         = Finals
| RD1-seed01  = M3
| RD1-team01  = Winchester
| RD1-seed02  = M6
| RD1-team02  = Ottawa
| RD1-score01 = 0
| RD1-score02 = 2
| RD1-seed03  = 
| RD1-team03  = 
| RD1-seed04  = 
| RD1-team04  = 
| RD1-score03 = 
| RD1-score04 = 
| RD1-seed05  = M4
| RD1-team05  = Casselman
| RD1-seed06  = M5
| RD1-team06  = Char-Lan
| RD1-score05 = 2
| RD1-score06 = 0
| RD1-seed07  = 
| RD1-team07  = 
| RD1-seed08  = 
| RD1-team08  = 
| RD1-score07 = 
| RD1-score08 = 
| RD1-seed09  = R4
| RD1-team09  = Athens
| RD1-seed10  = R5
| RD1-team10  = Westport
| RD1-score09 = 2
| RD1-score10 = 0
| RD1-seed11  =
| RD1-team11  = 
| RD1-seed12  = 
| RD1-team12  = 
| RD1-score11 = 
| RD1-score12 = 
| RD1-seed13  = R3
| RD1-team13  = Arnprior
| RD1-seed14  = R6
| RD1-team14  = Whitewater
| RD1-score13 = 2
| RD1-score14 = 1
| RD1-seed15  = 
| RD1-team15  = 
| RD1-seed16  = 
| RD1-team16  = 
| RD1-score15 = 
| RD1-score16 = 
| RD2-seed01  = M1
| RD2-team01  = Ottawa West
| RD2-seed02  = M6
| RD2-team02  = Ottawa
| RD2-score01 = 3
| RD2-score02 = 1
| RD2-seed03  = M2
| RD2-team03  = Embrun
| RD2-seed04  = M4
| RD2-team04  = Casselman
| RD2-score03 = 2
| RD2-score04 = 3
| RD2-seed05  = R1
| RD2-team05  = Carleton Place
| RD2-seed06  = R4
| RD2-team06  = Athens
| RD2-score05 = 3
| RD2-score06 = 2
| RD2-seed07  = R2
| RD2-team07  = Perth
| RD2-seed08  = R3
| RD2-team08  = Arnprior
| RD2-score07 = 3
| RD2-score08 = 2
| RD3-seed01  = M1
| RD3-team01  = Ottawa West
| RD3-seed02  = M4
| RD3-team02  = Casselman
| RD3-score01 = 2
| RD3-score02 = 4
| RD3-seed03  = R1
| RD3-team03  = Carleton Place
| RD3-seed04  = R2
| RD3-team04  = Perth
| RD3-score03 = 2
| RD3-score04 = 4| RD4-seed01  = M4| RD4-team01  = Casselman| RD4-seed02  = R2
| RD4-team02  = Perth
| RD4-score01 = 4| RD4-score02 = 2
}}

Other notable awardsGill Trophy Awarded to Rideau Division Playoff ChampionsAlex English Trophy Awarded to St. Lawrence Division Playoff ChampionsOttawa Nepean Sportsplex Trophy Awarded to Metro Division Playoff ChampionsCarl Foley Trophy Awarded to Valley Division Playoff ChampionsJohn Shorey Cup Awarded to Rideau/St. Lawrence Conference Playoff ChampionsDwaine Barkley Trophy''' Awarded to Metro/Valley Conference Playoff Champions

Former member teams

External links
Eastern Ontario Junior Hockey League

B
Ice hockey in Ottawa
B
Sports leagues established in 1966
1966 establishments in Ontario
Hockey Eastern Ontario